Yonatan Cohen (born 29 June 1996) is an Israeli professional association footballer who plays as an attacking midfielder or forward for Maccabi Tel Aviv, on loan from the Italian club Pisa, and the Israel national team.

Early life
Cohen was born in Tel Aviv, Israel, to a family of Ashkenazi Jewish descent, of Polish-Jewish descent on his mother's side. His older brother Guy Cohen is also a footballer, and his father Mickey Cohen is an Israeli retired footballer who played for Maccabi Tel Aviv as well.

He also holds a Polish passport, which eased his move to certain European football leagues.

Club career

Maccabi Tel Aviv

Cohen began playing youth football for Maccabi Tel aviv before going on loans to Beitar Tel Aviv Ramla and to Bnei Yehuda Tel Aviv. Then-manager Arik Benado brought Cohen to Bnei Yehuda Tel Aviv, where he made his senior debut in the Israeli Premier League. Cohen became an important player for Bnei Yehuda Tel Aviv during the 2016–17 season, relegating previously established midfielders Pedro Joaquín Galván and Amir Agayev to the bench.

Pisa
Since August 2021, Cohen plays for Pisa SC in the Italian Serie B having made his debut against Alessandria in Day 2, and scoring his first goal during the following fixture vs Ternana on 11 September.

Return to Maccabi Tel Aviv
On 29 September 2022, Pisa announced Cohen's return to Maccabi Tel Aviv. The transfer is initially a loan, at the end of the loan term Maccabi will be obligated to purchase his rights.

International career
Cohen made his debut for the senior Israel national team on 21 March 2019 in a UEFA Euro 2020 qualifier against Slovenia...

Honours
Bnei Yehuda Tel Aviv
 Israeli State Cup: 2016–17

Maccabi Tel Aviv
 Israeli Premier League:  2018–19, 2019–20
 Toto Cup: 2018–19, 2020–21

See also 

 List of Jewish footballers
 List of Jews in sports

References

External links 

Living people
1996 births
Israeli Ashkenazi Jews
Israeli footballers
Jewish footballers
Association football wingers
Israel international footballers
Israel youth international footballers
Israel under-21 international footballers
Maccabi Tel Aviv F.C. players
Beitar Tel Aviv Bat Yam F.C. players
Bnei Yehuda Tel Aviv F.C. players
Pisa S.C. players
Israeli Premier League players
Liga Leumit players
Serie B players
Israeli expatriate footballers
Israeli expatriate sportspeople in Italy
Expatriate footballers in Italy
Footballers from Tel Aviv
Israeli people of Polish-Jewish descent
Israeli Jews